Baraq was a khan of the Chagatai Khanate (1266–1271). He was the son of Yesünto'a and a great-grandson of Chagatai Khan.  A convert to Islam, he took the name Ghiyas-ud-din.

Background
Baraq's family had moved to China following his father's exile by the Great Khan Möngke Khan for his support of the house of Ögedei Khan. Baraq grew up in the camp of Kublai Khan and gained distinction there.

Early 1260s
Sometime in the early 1260s he traveled to Central Asia and earned the trust of Mubarak Shah. When the latter was again enthroned as Chagatai Khan in 1266, Baraq gained support among the army for a coup and deposed Mubarak Shah in September of that year. Almost immediately, he repudiated the authority of Kublai as Great Khan. He removed Kublai's representative of Chinese Turkestan, replacing him with one of his own governors. His vastly superior army prevented Kublai's officers from expelling him, and Khotan was ravaged by his forces. Nevertheless, Kublai Khan sent him a grant in 1268, in an effort to end the conflict and focus on Kaidu.

When Kaidu advanced towards Baraq, the latter set a trap for the invader's troops on the bank of the Jaxartes, and defeated his forces. In the next battle, however, Kaidu defeated Baraq near Khujand with the assistance of Mengu-Timur, the Khan of the Golden Horde who sent 3 tumens under his uncle Berkhe-Chir. Transoxiana was then ravaged by Kaidu. Baraq fled to Samarkand, then Bukhara, plundering the cities along the way in an attempt to rebuild his army. These actions alarmed Kaidu, who did not want the region to be further devastated. Kaidu also needed to free up his army for a potential conflict with Kublai. Peace was therefore proposed, and Baraq was pressured by the governors of the sedentary areas of the khanate, Mas'ud Beg and Daifu, to accept. He did, and peace was declared, although sources conflict on the time and location. Rashid al-Din claims that the meeting took place in the spring of 1269 in Talas, while Wassaf writes that it took place around 1267 to the south of Samarkand. In any case, two-thirds of Transoxiana were granted to Baraq, while the other third went to Kaidu and Mengu-Timur. Kaidu also gained control of the region around Bukhara. Neither side gained control of the cities; the direct administration of these instead devolved to Mas'ud Beg, while Baraq and Kaidu agreed to reside only in the deserts and mountains.

Baraq was displeased with the agreement; when Kaidu was preoccupied with Mengu-Timur's attempt to take his portion of Transoxiana, Baraq sent troops to reoccupy Bukhara in violation of the truce. He also later attempted to plunder both Samarkand and Bukhara, and Mas'ud Beg was hard-pressed to prevent this. Still, when he decided to attack the Ilkhanate in order to gain significant pasture, Kaidu agreed, as the Ilkhan Abaqa was an ally of Kublai. Kaidu provided troops for Baraq's invasion of the Ilkhanate, which began in 1269 or 1270. Qipchaq, who had been the one to initially approach Baraq requesting peace, and Chabat, a grandson of Güyük Khan, were among the representatives of Kaidu within Baraq's army. Baraq persuaded a Chaghadaid commander under the service of Abaqa, Tegüder, to revolt, and himself defeated the Ilkhan's forces in Khurasan. Soon afterward, Qipchaq entered into an argument with Baraq's general Jalayirtai, and used this as an excuse to head back to Kaidu. Baraq sent his brother, and later Jalayirtai, to recover Qipchaq, but without success. Soon, Chabat also abandoned the army, though much of his forces were crushed by Baraq's son in Bukhara. Baraq's protests to Kaidu were ineffective; the latter even entered into friendly relations with Abaqa.

Defeat
Having sent much of his troops against the deserters, Baraq suffered a large defeat at Herat on July 22, 1270 against the Ilkhan. Wounded, he fled back to Bukhara, while many of his troops deserted to the enemy. He sent a letter to Kaidu, blaming Qipchaq and Chabat for his loss and requesting assistance. Kaidu sent a large force in response. When Baraq's lieutenants had neutralized the rebels, he wrote that the assistance was no longer necessary, but Kaidu's force continued to approach, with the intention of destroying the power of the Chaghadaids. His army surrounded Baraq's camp, but upon reaching the camp realized that Baraq had died during the previous night. Most of Baraq's generals then submitted to Kaidu's authority. Wassaf, in contrast, claims that Baraq's generals had abandoned him while he was alive, and that Baraq had no choice to submit to Kaidu, who poisoned him. Only a month later, Kaidu had himself crowned Khan and reserved the right to appoint the head of the Chagatai Khanate, a power he retained for the rest of his life. The Chagatai Khans thus became puppets of Kaidu for the next thirty years. His sons, however, would continue to fight Kaidu's authority for a long time after Baraq's death.

Genealogy

In Baburnama, Babur described the genealogy of his maternal grandfather Yunas Khan as:

"Yunas Khan descended from Chaghatai Khan, the second
son of Chingiz Khan (as follows,) Yunas Khan, son of Wais
Khan, son of Sher-'ali Aughlon, son of Muhammad Khan, son
of Khizr Khwaja Khan, son of Tughluq-timur Khan, son of
Aisan-bugha Khan, son of Dawa Khan, son of Baraq Khan,
son of Yesuntawa Khan, son of Muatukan, son of Chaghatai
Khan, son of Chingiz Khan"

See also
 Kaidu–Kublai war

{| class="wikitable" style="margin:1em auto 1em auto; page-break-inside:avoid"
|+ Genealogy of Abdul Karim Khan according to Mirza Muhammad Haidar Dughlat
|- valign="top"
| style="border:none;"| Chingiz Khan
Chaghatai Khan
Mutukan
Yesü Nto'a
Ghiyas-ud-din Baraq
Duwa
Esen Buqa I
| style="border:none"| <ol start="8">
Tughlugh Timur
Khizr Khoja
Muhammad Khan (Khan of Moghulistan)
Shir Ali Oglan
Uwais Khan (Vaise Khan)
Yunus Khan
Ahmad Alaq</li>
</ol>
| style="border:none"| Sultan Said Khan
Abdurashid Khan
Abdul Karim Khan (Yarkand)
|}"Chughtai Khanates" A research project by Dr. Abdul Rauf Mughal

References

Michal Biran, Qaidu and the Rise of the Independent Mongol State in Central Asia''. The Curzon Press, 1997, .

1271 deaths
Chagatai khans
Converts to Islam
Mongol Empire Muslims
13th-century monarchs in Asia
Year of birth unknown